is a Japanese anime director and screenwriter. Since 2014, he has directed multiple series, including the adaptations of Fate/kaleid liner Prisma Illya and Chaos;Child.

Biography
He worked at Studio Graffiti as an apprentice, and at Studio Cab and Studio Sion as a production manager. In 2005, he directed the web anime Hito Ken Mamoru-kun to Ayumi-chan "Sekai o Shiawase ni". In 2014, Jinbo made his major directorial debut with the second season of the anime series Fate/kaleid liner Prisma Illya.

In 2018, Jinbo established PartsCraft, a company that specializes in animation planning and production. In 2022, he was nominated for Best Director at the Newtype Anime Awards for his work on The Quintessential Quintuplets Movie.

Works

TV series
 Ginga Densetsu Weed (2006; storyboards)
 Zoids: Genesis (2006; episode director)
 Simoun (2006; episode director)
 Hell Girl (2006, 2017; episode director)
 C³ (2012; episode director)
 Kill Me Baby (2012; episode director)
 Kokoro Connect (2012; episode director)
 Saint Seiya Omega (2012; storyboards)
 Natsuyuki Rendezvous (2012; episode director, storyboards)
 Fate/kaleid liner Prisma Illya (2014–2016; director)
 Shomin Sample (2015; director)
 Star-Myu (2015; episode director, storyboards)
 Chaos;Child (2017; director, series composition)
 Restaurant to Another World (2017–2021; director, series composition)
 Senryu Girl (2019; director, series composition)
 Room Camp (2020; director)
 White Cat Project: Zero Chronicle (2020; director, series composition)
 Super HxEros (2020; director, series composition)
 Azur Lane: Slow Ahead! (2021; director)
 The Rising of the Shield Hero 2 (2022; director)
 Legend of Mana: The Teardrop Crystal (2022; director, series composition)

Films
 Chaos;Child: Silent Sky (2017; director, series composition)
 The Quintessential Quintuplets Movie (2022; director)

Original video animation
 Shakugan no Shana S (2010; episode director)
 Otome wa Boku ni Koishiteru: Futari no Elder (2012; episode director, storyboards)
 Nozo × Kimi (2014–2015; director)

Web series
 Hito Ken Mamoru-kun to Ayumi-chan "Sekai o Shiawase ni" (2005; director)
 Kyō no Asuka Show (2012; series director)

References

External links
 

Anime directors
Anime screenwriters
Japanese animated film directors
Japanese storyboard artists
Japanese television directors
Japanese television writers
Living people
People from Tokyo
Year of birth missing (living people)